Nicolò Leti was a Roman Catholic prelate who served as Bishop of Acquapendente (1655–1674).

Biography
Nicolò Leti was born in Spoleto, Italy in 1605.
On 14 June 1655, he was appointed during the papacy of Pope Alexander VII as Bishop of Acquapendente.
He served as Bishop of Acquapendente until his resignation on 30 September 1674.

References

External links and additional sources
 (for Chronology of Bishops) 
 (for Chronology of Bishops)  

17th-century Italian Roman Catholic bishops
Bishops appointed by Pope Alexander VII
1605 births